The Critics' Choice Television Awards are accolades that are presented annually by the Critics Choice Association (CCA). They were established in 2011, and the first ceremony was held on June 20, 2011, and streamed live on VH1.com. The fourth ceremony was televised live, for the first time in award history, on June 19, 2014, on The CW. In October 2014, the A&E Network was granted exclusive rights to broadcast the television and film awards in 2015 and 2016.

History
The Broadcast Television Journalists Association (BTJA) was founded in 2011 as an offshoot of the Broadcast Film Critics Association. The Awards are produced by executive producer Bob Bain.

According to the acting president of the BTJA, Joey Berlin, the Critics' Choice Television Awards were launched "to enhance access for broadcast journalists covering the television industry. Just as the Critics' Choice Movie Awards has been established as an important part of the annual movie awards season, we are confident that the Critics' Choice Television Awards will play a similar role for the television industry."

Categories

Criticism 
Following the announcement of the partnership with Entertainment Weekly prior to the 7th Critics' Choice Television Awards in November 2016, several high profile members of the Broadcast Television Journalists Association left the organization, including Michael Ausiello of TVLine, Maureen Ryan of Variety, Ken Tucker of Yahoo! TV, and Michael Schneider of IndieWire. In an article Schneider published shortly after his resignation titled, he wrote: "The idea that Entertainment Weekly would be the preferred media outlet for an awards show decided by journalists from many outlets is unusual. (It would be like CNN being named the official partner of the Presidential Debates, even though they're moderated and covered by representatives from multiple news organizations.)" Following the mass exodus of television critics, the Broadcast Television Journalists Association lost 15%–30% of its membership. This caused the majority of the membership to be made up of internet journalists instead of television critics. During the 7th Critics' Choice Television Awards the fact that several critically acclaimed shows were snubbed such as The Americans, Rectify, The Night Of and You're the Worst in favor of shows with very little to no critical support such as Modern Family, The Big Bang Theory, and House of Cards was credited, and widely criticized, due to this change.

Award ceremonies
2010/11
2011/12
2012/13
2013/14
2014/15
2015
2016
2017
2018
2019
2020
2021
2022
2023

Superlatives

Multiple winners
3 awards
 Allison Janney
 Sarah Paulson

2 awards

 Tom Bergeron
 Mayim Bialik
 Andre Braugher
 Louis C.K.
 Bryan Cranston
 Julia Louis-Dreyfus
 Christina Hendricks
 Margo Martindale
 Tatiana Maslany
 Jim Parsons
 Jeffrey Tambor
 Bob Odenkirk

Multiple nominees
7 nominations
 Walton Goggins

5 nominations
 Tom Bergeron
 Bob Odenkirk 
 Cat Deeley
 Freddie Highmore
 Regina King
 Jessica Lange
 Julianna Margulies
 Timothy Olyphant
 Eden Sher

4 nominations

 Anthony Anderson
 Christine Baranski
 Mayim Bialik
 Louis C.K.
 Allison Janney
 Julia Louis-Dreyfus
 Tatiana Maslany
 Elisabeth Moss
 Jim Parsons
 Sarah Paulson
 Amy Poehler
 RuPaul

3 nominations

 Gillian Anderson
 Aziz Ansari
 Ellen Burstyn
 Emilia Clarke
 Carrie Coon
 Bryan Cranston
 Benedict Cumberbatch
 Peter Dinklage
 Vera Farmiga
 Anna Gunn
 Margo Martindale
 Thomas Middleditch
 Nick Offerman
 Martha Plimpton
 Carrie Preston
 Danny Pudi
 RuPaul
 Matthew Rhys
 Keri Russell
 John Slattery
 Robin Wright
 Constance Wu

2 nominations

 Ted Allen
 Caitriona Balfe
 Jonathan Banks
 Kathy Bates
 Julie Bowen
 Andre Braugher
 Alison Brie
 Sterling K. Brown
 Tituss Burgess
 Ty Burrell
 Jaime Camil
 Bobby Cannavale
 Don Cheadle
 Kaley Cuoco
 Hugh Dancy
 Claire Danes
 Viola Davis
 Zooey Deschanel
 Ann Dowd
 Lena Dunham
 Christopher Eccleston
 Idris Elba
 Will Forte
 Sutton Foster
 Claire Foy
 Martin Freeman
 Eva Green
 Max Greenfield
 Tony Hale
 Jon Hamm
 Christina Hendricks
 Taraji P. Henson
 Charlie Hunnam
 Jane Krakowski
 Damian Lewis
 Jenifer Lewis
 Judith Light
 Rami Malek
 Kelly Macdonald
 Joel McHale
 Wendi McLendon-Covey
 John Noble
 Ed O'Neill
 Randall Park
 Aaron Paul
 Diana Rigg
 Gina Rodriguez
 Emmy Rossum
 Katey Sagal
 Amy Schumer
 Adam Scott
 Ryan Seacrest
 Maggie Siff
 Jeffrey Tambor
 Cicely Tyson
 Dominic West
 Casey Wilson
 Patrick Wilson
 Aden Young
 Constance Zimmer

See also

 List of American television awards

References

External links
 

American television awards
Awards established in 2011
 
 Television Awards